The Microregion of Guaratinguetá is a microregion in the east of São Paulo State, Brazil.  The microregion is the bordered by the state of Rio de Janeiro to the north.

Municipalities 
The microregion consists of the following municipalities:
 Aparecida
 Cachoeira Paulista
 Canas
 Cruzeiro
 Guaratinguetá
 Lavrinhas
 Lorena
 Piquete
 Potim
 Queluz
 Roseira

References

Guaratingueta